Doctor Mid-Nite (Pieter Cross) (also Doctor Midnight) is a fictional superhero in DC Comics, the third character named Doctor Mid-Nite, first appearing in Doctor Mid-Nite #1. 

Much like the original version of Doctor Mid-Nite, he has exhibited the same basic features: a cowled costume featuring a crescent moon symbol, keen ability to see in the darkness at the cost of near or total blindness in sunlight, the use of special visors and “blackout” smoke bombs to gain tactical advantage in combat, a high degree of skill in martial arts, and jobs as physicians serving both normal human beings and "metahuman" superheroes. Additionally, two of the doctors have been accompanied by sidekick owls.

Fictional character biography
The third Doctor Mid-Nite (and the second to use the original spelling) is Pieter Anton Cross. Cross makes his first appearance in the 3-issue prestige format limited series Doctor Mid-Nite (1999).

Cross is the Norwegian-born son of a noted scientist, the late Theodoric Cross. Pieter was delivered as a baby by the original Doctor Mid-Nite, Charles McNider, who had just rescued his mother from vagrants. As an adult Pieter is later unable to save his mother from Chagas disease, which she catches in Brazil while visiting him. Cross otherwise has no known relatives.

Cross's crime-fighting career begins as he runs a free clinic in Portsmouth, Washington. His work leads him to investigate a new street drug called A39, an accidental derivative of the steroid-like Venom. The drug, he soon learns, is produced by an evil corporation named Praeda Industries, run by the Terrible Trio (former foes of the Batman). Cross is drugged by company enforcers and soon involved in a car accident. The accident takes the life of a young woman named Katherine Blythe. After the accident, he finds that he can only see in pitch darkness via infrared vision (he can also employ ultrasonic vision). Stripped of his licence to officially practise medicine, he takes the name Doctor Mid-Nite and resolves to fight crime. Cross joins the newest incarnation of the Justice Society of America, and enjoys a brief romance with teammate Black Canary.

Cross is usually portrayed as being a physician first and vigilante second, setting up a clinic to help him treat patients who cannot afford conventional health care. Scanners in his cowl-lenses identify health risks as well as threats. He is a vegetarian and practices yoga (JSA). Cross carries high-tech medical equipment in addition to weapons (including blackout bombs). Some individuals whom Cross assists eventually come to aid him in his work as both crime fighter and community surgeon. Allies gained in this way include reformed street kids "Nite Lite" and "Ice Sickle" and writer Camilla Marlowe. (Ice Sickle is later killed by the vengeful Spirit King.) Dr. Mid-Nite also serves as a wise and kind mentor to young Jaime Reyes, the latest Blue Beetle.

Cross's Doctor Mid-Nite is one of the most prominent physicians in the DCU. He and his JSA colleague Mr. Terrific function as "go-to" scientists for the superhero set. Among Cross' notable achievements: the discovery that Alan Scott is composed of the green flame of the Starheart; conducting tests and annual checkups for Power Girl; emergency surgery on Hourman; removal of the Brainiac virus from Oracle; the autopsy of Sue Dibny (Identity Crisis); removing the sniper bullet that wounds Lois Lane in Umec (Battery story arc in Adventures of Superman); conducting DNA tests on Terra. 

Cross is also called upon by medical agencies such as S.T.A.R. Labs during unusual cases. At one point he is called by S.T.A.R. to investigate the reappearance of Delores Winters, the first host for the Ultra-Humanite. Winters now steals the body parts of metahumans and calls herself Endless Winter. Doctor Mid-Nite puts an end to the thievery and helps restore the health of her victims. 

Batman conducts covert research on Cross's abilities and concludes that the full extent of his enhanced vision has not yet been reached (JSA 31). Batman has apparently not revealed this information to Cross.

When the Justice Society encounters Gog, last survivor of the Third World, the benevolent being restores Pieter's vision. Although initially a blessing, this later works to Pieter's disadvantage in the field, as he is no longer able to see through his own dark bombs, and the loss of his infrared vision prevents him from saving a mortally wounded Lance as well as leaving him feeling challenged when trying to perform even normal operations. Eventually, the full JSA mount an all-out assault on Gog, having learned from Sandman that Gog is rooting himself into the Earth, and if he remains for one more day, the Earth will die if he ever leaves, leaving them with the one option of killing Gog and separating his head from the Earth, which is the only way to save the planet. The other Society members following Gog attempt to protect him, until they see him attempt to attack a Society member. All of the followers take up the fight, and Gog punishes them all by taking away his blessings, including Dr. Mid-Nite's sight.

After being contacted by current Teen Titan leader Beast Boy, Dr. Mid-Nite is called in to help Raven when she is attacked and possessed by an unknown demonic entity. Appearing in Titans Tower via hologram technology, Dr. Mid-Nite and Static are successfully able to drive the demon from Raven's body.

Other versions
In the new Earth-2 created in the wake of Infinite Crisis and 52, a version of Beth Chapel is shown to be a member of the Justice Society Infinity.

Collected editions

The introductory mini-series of the modern Dr. Mid-Nite (Pieter Cross) has been collected in a trade paperback.

In other media

Television

 Pieter Cross makes several brief non-speaking appearances in Justice League Unlimited. This version is a member of an expanded Justice League.
 Pieter Cross appears in Young Justice, voiced by Bruce Greenwood. This version works as a surgeon.

Toys
DC Direct released an action figure of Pieter Cross / Doctor Mid-Nite.

References

External links
 JSA Fact File: Doctor Mid-Nite I
 Doctor Mid-Nite at Don Markstein's Toonopedia. Archived from the original on April 4, 2016.

Characters created by Roy Thomas
Characters created by Todd McFarlane
Comics characters introduced in 1999
DC Comics martial artists
DC Comics metahumans
DC Comics male superheroes
DC Comics titles
Earth-Two
Fictional characters from parallel universes
Fictional blind characters
Fictional physicians
Fictional surgeons